17 Pashons - Coptic calendar - 19 Pashons

Fixed commemorations
All fixed commemorations below are observed on 18 Pashons (26 May) by the Coptic Orthodox Church.

Saints
Saint Georges, the companion of Saint Abraam

References
Coptic Synexarion

Days of the Coptic calendar